Knebworth 1996 is a 2021 documentary film and live album by English rock band Oasis.  The First of The Two Live Knebworth Films Including Liam Gallagher: Knebworth 22 The film was directed by Jake Scott and released on 23 September 2021, while the album was released on 19 November 2021. Both were recorded on 10–11 August 1996 at the Knebworth Festival at Knebworth House, England. By the week after its release, the film had become the highest-grossing documentary of 2021 in the UK.

Release
Various tracks from Oasis Knebworth concerts have been previously released on various special and limited releases, with and without the exact concert date specification. "Champagne Supernova" from 11 August was released on …There and Then limited CD. "Cast No Shadow" and "Columbia" from 10 and 11 August respectively were released as iTunes bonus tracks to Stop the Clocks compilation album. "The Masterplan" and "Wonderwall" from 10 August were released on (What's the Story) Morning Glory? 2014 reissue, the latter as Japanese only bonus track. "My Big Mouth" from 10 August was released on Be Here Now 2016 reissue.

Track listing

Personnel
Oasis
 Liam Gallagher – lead vocals, tambourine
 Noel Gallagher – lead guitar, vocals
 Paul Arthurs – rhythm guitar
 Paul McGuigan – bass guitar
 Alan White – drums

Additional musicians
 Mark Feltham – harmonica 
 Janet Mason – keyboards
 Anne Morfee – 1st violin
 Anna Hemery – 2nd violin
 Katie Heller – viola
 Sue Dence – viola
 Emma Black – cello
 Dave Bishop – saxophone
 Jamie Talbot – saxophone
 Steve Sidwell – trumpet
 Simon Gardner – trumpet
 Stuart Brooks – trumpet
 John Squire – guitar on "Champagne Supernova" and "I Am the Walrus"

Charts

Certifications and sales

References

2020s British films
2020s English-language films
2021 documentary films
2021 films
2021 live albums
Big Brother Recordings live albums
British documentary films
Documentary films about musical groups
1996
Live albums recorded in the United Kingdom
Live video albums
Oasis (band) live albums